The Garden City Charity Classic is a tournamenton the Epson Tour, the LPGA's developmental tour. It has been a part of the Epson Tour's schedule since 2014. It is held at Buffalo Dunes Golf Club in Garden City, Kansas.

The 2020 tournament was cancelled due to the COVID-19 pandemic.

Winners

References

External links
Coverage on Epson Tour website

Symetra Tour events
Golf in Kansas
Recurring sporting events established in 2014
2014 establishments in Kansas